Terence Taylor (born 29 June 2001) is a professional footballer who plays as a midfielder for Burton Albion. Born in Scotland, he represents Wales at under-21 international level.

Career
Taylor made his first team debut for Wolverhampton Wanderers, whose academy he had progressed from after moving from his hometown Aberdeen, on 30 October 2019 in an EFL Cup tie against Aston Villa. He had also been part of the club's pre-season tour of China, where he played in the club's Premier League Asia Trophy Final victory against Manchester City.

On 7 September 2020, Taylor joined Grimsby Town on a season-long loan, with manager Ian Holloway stating Taylor was in line for his debut in an EFL Trophy tie with Harrogate Town the next day. After getting injured and missing out on Holloway's final five games before his resignation and not playing any games under new manager Paul Hurst, Wolves recalled Taylor in the winter transfer window.

On 1 February 2021, Taylor joined League One side Burton Albion on a permanent deal, signing a two-and-a-half year deal.

International
Taylor played for both Scotland and Wales as a youth and qualifies for Wales through his mother, whose family are all Welsh, and was born in Cardiff. He represented Scotland at under-17 and under-18 level. He made his debut for the Wales under-21 team on 19 November 2019 as a second-half substitute in the 1–0 win against Bosnia-Herzegovina. He has then gone on to represent the under-21 side a further 5 times, captaining them as well.

Career statistics

References

External links

2001 births
Living people
Footballers from Irvine, North Ayrshire
Welsh footballers
Scottish footballers
Association football midfielders
Wolverhampton Wanderers F.C. players
Grimsby Town F.C. players
Aberdeen F.C. players
Burton Albion F.C. players
English Football League players
Scotland youth international footballers
Wales under-21 international footballers
Scottish people of Welsh descent